List of television stations in Georgia may refer to:

 List of television stations in Georgia (U.S. state)
 Television in Georgia (country)